In the mathematical field of graph theory, a toroidal graph is a graph that can be embedded on a torus. In other words, the graph's vertices can be placed on a torus such that no edges cross.

Examples
Any graph that can be embedded in a plane can also be embedded in a torus. A toroidal graph of genus 1 can be embedded in a torus but not in a plane. The Heawood graph, the complete graph K7 (and hence K5 and K6), the Petersen graph (and hence the complete bipartite graph K3,3, since the Petersen graph contains a subdivision of it), one of the Blanuša snarks, and all Möbius ladders are toroidal. More generally, any graph with crossing number 1 is toroidal. Some graphs with greater crossing numbers are also toroidal: the Möbius–Kantor graph, for example, has crossing number 4 and is toroidal.

Properties
Any toroidal graph has chromatic number at most 7. The complete graph K7 provides an example of a toroidal graph with chromatic number 7.

Any triangle-free toroidal graph has chromatic number at most 4.

By a result analogous to Fáry's theorem, any toroidal graph may be drawn with straight edges in a rectangle with periodic boundary conditions.  Furthermore, the analogue of Tutte's spring theorem applies in this case.
Toroidal graphs also have book embeddings with at most 7 pages.

Obstructions
By the Robertson–Seymour theorem, there exists a finite set H of minimal non-toroidal graphs, such that a graph is toroidal if and only if it has no graph minor in H.
That is, H forms the set of forbidden minors for the toroidal graphs.
The complete set H is not known, but it has at least 17,523 graphs. Alternatively, there are at least 250,815 non-toroidal graphs that are minimal in the topological minor ordering.
A graph is toroidal if and only if it has none of these graphs as a topological minor.

Gallery

See also
Planar graph
Topological graph theory
Császár polyhedron

Notes

References
.
.
.
.
.
.
.

.
.

Graph families
Topological graph theory